Spiros Zournatzis (7 October 1935 – 12 September 2022) was a Greek politician. A member of the National Political Union and the European Right, he served in the European Parliament from February to July 1989.

Zournatzis died on 12 September 2022, at the age of 86.

References

1935 births
2022 deaths
Greek politicians
Members of the European Parliament
People from Karditsa (regional unit)